Picon may refer to:

 Avatar (computing), used in the Apple Computer instant messaging program iChat
 Picón, Spain
 Picon (apéritif), an apéritif
 Picon Punch, a drink popularized by Basque-Americans
 One of the Twelve Colonies of Kobol in the television show Battlestar Galactica
 Personal icon, referenced in Vismon

People
 Gaëtan Picon (1915-1976), French essayist and art critic
 José Antonio Picón Sedano (born 1988), Spanish footballer known as Picón
 Mariano Picón Salas (1901–1965), Venezuelan diplomat
 Molly Picon (1898–1992), American actress